You Are Guilty is a 1923 American silent drama film directed by Edgar Lewis and starring James Kirkwood, Doris Kenyon and Robert Edeson.

Synopsis
Stephen Martin takes the blame over some missing funds in order to spare his half-brother shame. He is forced to give up his sweetheart and travel around the world.

Cast
 James Kirkwood as 	Stephen Martin
 Doris Kenyon as Alice Farrell
 Robert Edeson as Theodore Tennent
 Mary Carr as Mrs. Grantwood
 Russell Griffin as 'Buddy' Tennent
 Edmund Breese as Judge Elkins
 Carlton Brickert as	Joseph D. Grantwood
 Riley Hatch as Murphy

References

Bibliography
 Connelly, Robert B. The Silents: Silent Feature Films, 1910–36, Volume 40, Issue 2. December Press, 1998.
 Munden, Kenneth White. The American Film Institute Catalog of Motion Pictures Produced in the United States, Part 1. University of California Press, 1997.

External links
 

1923 films
1923 drama films
1920s English-language films
American silent feature films
Silent American drama films
Films directed by Edgar Lewis
American black-and-white films
1920s American films